The Pomeranchuk Prize is an international award for theoretical physics, awarded annually since 1998 by the Institute for Theoretical and Experimental Physics (ITEP) from Moscow. It is named after Russian physicist Isaak Yakovlevich Pomeranchuk, who together with Landau established the Theoretical Physics Department of the Institute.

Laureates
 2020 Sergio Ferrara and Mikhail Andrejewitsch Vasiliev
 2019 Roger Penrose and Vladimir S. Popov
 2018 Giorgio Parisi and Lev Pitaevskii
 2017 Igor Klebanov and Juri Moissejewitsch Kagan
 2016 Curtis J. Callan and Yuri A. Simonov 
 2015 Stanley J. Brodsky and Victor Fadin
 2014 Leonid Keldysh and Alexander Zamolodchikov 
 2013 Mikhail Shifman and Andrei Slavnov
 2012 Juan Martín Maldacena and Spartak Belyaev
 2011 Heinrich Leutwyler and Semyon Gershtein
 2010 André Martin and Valentine Zakharov
 2009 Nicola Cabibbo and Boris Ioffe
 2008 Leonard Susskind and Lev Okun
 2007 Alexander Belavin and Yoichiro Nambu
 2006 Vadim Kuzmin and Howard Georgi
 2005 Iosif Khriplovich and Arkady Vainshtein
 2004 Alexander F. Andreev and Alexander Polyakov
 2003 Valery Rubakov and Freeman Dyson
 2002 Ludvig Faddeev and Bryce Seligman DeWitt
 2001 Lev Lipatov and Tullio Regge
 2000 Evgenii Feinberg and James Daniel Bjorken
 1999 Karen Ter-Martirosian and Gabriele Veneziano
 1998 Aleksander Ilyich Akhiezer and Sidney Drell

See also

 List of physics awards

References

External links
 

Physics awards
Awards established in 1998
Russian science and technology awards